Sandling may refer to:

Places
 Sandling, Austria, in Altaussee
 Sandling, Folkestone, Folkestone and Hythe, Kent, England
 Sandling railway station
 Sandling, Maidstone, Kent, England
 Sandlings, Suffolk, England

Other
 Sandling (Dungeons & Dragons)
 Richard Sandling, a British comedian